Olga Ilyinichna Ulyanova (Russian: Ольга Ильинична Ульянова; 4 November 1871 – 8 May 1891) was a Russian noblewoman, polyglot, and the sister of Vladimir Lenin. She was born into a wealthy family of middle-class status but, in 1882, the family were elevated into the hereditary nobility. Ulyanova excelled in academics and planned to become a teacher, but was denied the position due to her brother Aleksandr Ulyanov's criminal offenses as a revolutionary. She was later given a certificate of reliability that allowed her to enroll in the Bestuzhev Courses in St. Petersburg. She studied French, German, English, Swedish, Italian, and Latin at Bestuzhev, as well as mathematics, physics, and drawing. Ulyanova had hoped to practice medicine once completing her studies, but died after contracting typhoid fever just six months after arriving in St. Petersburg.

Early life and family 

Ulyanova was born in Simbrisk on 4 November 1871 as the fifth child of Ilya Ulyanov and Maria Alexandrovna Blank. Her mother was a member of the wealthy Blank family of German and Swedish descent. Her father was the son of Nikolai Vasilievich Ulyanov, a former serf who received his freedom from the landowner Stepan Mikhailovich Brekhov.

Ulyanova was the sister of Vladimir Ulyanov (Lenin), Maria Ilyinichna Ulyanova, Anna Ulyanova, Aleksandr Ulyanov, and Dmitry Ilyich Ulyanov. She was the closest to Lenin out of all of her siblings.

Ulyanova was baptized in the Russian Orthodox faith on 9 November 1871 at the Tikhvin Monastery of the Dormition of the Mother of God. Her godparents were Vladimir Alexandrovich Aunovsky and Anna Alexandrovna Kurbatova. Her mother taught her how to embroider with satin stitch and cross stitch. In January 1882, her father's dedication to education earned him the Order of Saint Vladimir, which bestowed on him and the Ulyanov family the status of hereditary nobility.

Education and death 
When she was seven years old, she was sent to the First Women's Parish School but, after studying there for one year, she began being tutored at home by her older sister, Anna. From 1883 to 1887, Ulyanova studied at the Mariinsky Women's Gymnasium in Simbrisk. She graduated with honors. Ulyanova applied for a teaching position in Samara but was denied the post due to being related to a state criminal, as her brother, Alexander, had been executed in 1887 for revolutionary tendencies. In April 1890, she received a certificate of reliability and, in the fall of that year, was admitted to the Bestuzhev Courses in St. Petersburg. She studied physics, mathematics, English, German, French, Swedish, Latin, Italian, and drawing while enrolled at Bestuzhev. She had hopes of studying medicine. After studying in St. Petersburg for six months, Ulyanova contracted typhoid fever and died at the Alexander Hospital on 8 May 1891. She was buried in Volkovo Cemetery.

References 

19th-century women from the Russian Empire
Deaths from typhoid fever
Russian Orthodox Christians from Russia
Russian people of German descent
Russian people of Swedish descent
Russian untitled nobility
Olga Ilyinichna
1871 births
1891 deaths